The Cisco Snap 100 is an Italian designed piston engine for use on paramotors and paragliders. Designed and built by Cisco Motors the Snap 100 is a two-stroke 96 cc capacity, single cylinder, lightweight engine with electronic ignition, producing 17 BHP at 9000 rpm.

Accidents and incidents
The propeller assembly on the Snap 100 is held in by one bolt and has been prone to fall out and cause the propeller to fall off.

Applications
Bailey Snap 100 (Paramotor)  
Fly Products Ryan (Paramotor) 
Fresh Breeze Snap 100 (Paramotor) 
Clemente Snap 100 (Paramotor)

Specifications (Snap 100)

See also

References

Notes

External links
Cisco Snap 100 Maintenance manual

2000s aircraft piston engines